In Greek mythology, Axion was the name of the following two individuals. 
 Axion, son of Phegeus of Psophis in Arcadia and brother of Temenus and Alphesiboea. At the command of their father, Axion together with his brother murdered by treachery their brother-in-law Alcmaeon and the two then dedicated the necklace of Harmonia to the god Apollo in Delphi. It is said that when the expedition of the Greeks to Troy took place, Axion and Temenus were the kings in the city that was still called Phegia (former name of Psophis). The people of Psophis assert that the reason why they took no part in the expedition was because their princes had incurred the enmity of the leaders of the Argives, who were in most cases related by blood to Alcmaeon, and had joined him in his campaign against Thebes. Later on, the widowed sister, Alphesiboea killed her own brothers in revenge of her husband's death.  Otherwise, Apollodorus calls the two sons of Phegeus, Agenor and Pronous.
 Axion, son of Priam of Troy, who was killed by Eurypylus, son of Euaemon during the Trojan War.

Notes

References 

 Apollodorus, The Library with an English Translation by Sir James George Frazer, F.B.A., F.R.S. in 2 Volumes, Cambridge, MA, Harvard University Press; London, William Heinemann Ltd. 1921. ISBN 0-674-99135-4. Online version at the Perseus Digital Library. Greek text available from the same website.
Gaius Julius Hyginus, Fabulae from The Myths of Hyginus translated and edited by Mary Grant. University of Kansas Publications in Humanistic Studies. Online version at the Topos Text Project.
 Pausanias, Description of Greece with an English Translation by W.H.S. Jones, Litt.D., and H.A. Ormerod, M.A., in 4 Volumes. Cambridge, MA, Harvard University Press; London, William Heinemann Ltd. 1918. . Online version at the Perseus Digital Library
Pausanias, Graeciae Descriptio. 3 vols. Leipzig, Teubner. 1903.  Greek text available at the Perseus Digital Library.
 Sextus Propertius, Elegies from Charm. Vincent Katz. trans. Los Angeles. Sun & Moon Press. 1995. Online version at the Perseus Digital Library. Latin text available at the same website.

Princes in Greek mythology
Kings in Greek mythology
Trojans
Children of Priam
Arcadian mythology